Derek Richardson (born 13 July 1956) is an English former professional footballer who played as  goalkeeper.

Career
Born in Hackney, Richardson played professionally for Chelsea, Queens Park Rangers, Sheffield United, and Coventry City, making a total of 73 appearances in the Football League. He later played non-League football with Maidstone United, Welling United and Fisher Athletic, before becoming a London taxi driver.

He also played at international level for England at youth and semi-professional.

In 1979, he played in a benefit match for West Bromwich Albion player Len Cantello, that saw a team of white players play against a team of black players.

In December 2016, amid the United Kingdom football sexual abuse scandal, Richardson became the third former Chelsea player to allege abuse by former chief scout Eddie Heath.

References

1956 births
Living people
Footballers from the London Borough of Hackney
English footballers
Chelsea F.C. players
Queens Park Rangers F.C. players
Sheffield United F.C. players
Coventry City F.C. players
Maidstone United F.C. (1897) players
Welling United F.C. players
Fisher Athletic F.C. players
English Football League players
Association football goalkeepers
England youth international footballers
England semi-pro international footballers